"The Male Animal" was an American television play broadcast on March 13, 1958, as part of the second season of the CBS television series Playhouse 90. Helene Hanff wrote the teleplay, as an adaptation of the play by James Thurber and Elliott Nugent. Andy Griffith, Gale Gordon, Ann Rutherford, and Edmond O'Brien starred.

Plot
An English professor challenges the school's trustees over issues of academic freedom as his wife's old boyfriend returns to campus for a sporting event.

Cast
The following performers received screen credit for their performances:

 Andy Griffith - Prof. Tommy Turner
 Ann Rutherford - Ellen Turner
 Edmond O'Brien - Joe Ferguson
 Charles Ruggles - Dean Damon
 Gale Gordon - Ed Keller
 Dick Sargent - Michael
 Ronnie Knox

References

1958 television plays
1958 American television episodes
Playhouse 90 (season 2) episodes